Aaron Richard Ashmore (born October 7, 1979) is a Canadian actor. He is known for his roles on American television series such as Jimmy Olsen on Smallville, Steve Jinks on Warehouse 13 and Johnny Jaqobis on the Canadian television series Killjoys. He is the identical twin brother of actor Shawn Ashmore.

Career
Ashmore is known for playing Marc Hall in Prom Queen: The Marc Hall Story. Since then, he has appeared in the films Safe, A Separate Peace, and A Bear Named Winnie. He has also had guest roles on television shows such as The Eleventh Hour, The West Wing, and 1-800-Missing. Ashmore played the recurring role of Troy Vandegraff on the UPN television series Veronica Mars, as well as the role of Agent Steve Jinks on the Syfy show Warehouse 13.

He was cast as Jimmy Olsen for the sixth season of Smallville on the WB television network and continued to play him into its eighth season. Two years after leaving the show, Ashmore returned to play his character's younger brother on the series finale. Ashmore's twin brother Shawn appeared on Smallville in earlier seasons, and he was offered the role of Jimmy Olsen by director Bryan Singer in Superman Returns before Sam Huntington was cast.

Besides his recurring role on Smallville, Ashmore had roles in the 2007 films Palo Alto, Privileged, The Stone Angel and The Christmas Cottage. He starred in the horror film Fear Island. MTV.ca announced on October 6, 2010, that he would have a role in the Maple Pictures comedy film Servitude.

In 2010, Ashmore starred as Marcus, one of three journalists who investigate a cult said to practice human sacrifice in a small town in Poland, in the horror film The Shrine. He also starred as Eric in the romantic comedy Conception. In 2011, Ashmore joined season three of the Syfy series Warehouse 13, in which he played the role of ATF agent Steve Jinks, a human polygraph of sorts, who has the unique ability to discern whether someone is lying or not.

Ashmore next starred in the 2014 rom-com thriller I Put a Hit on You as Ray, a man whose girlfriend tries to have him assassinated after he rejects her marriage proposal. In 2015, Ashmore played a supporting role in the thriller film Regression; starred as Nick Hopewell in the Lifetime original film Swept Under; began his role as John Jaqobis, an interplanetary bounty hunter, in the Syfy original series Killjoys; and starred as Jesse in his second Lifetime film, Wish Upon a Christmas. Killjoys ended after its fifth season in 2019.

Personal life
Aaron and his identical twin brother Shawn (also an actor) were born in Richmond, British Columbia, the sons of Linda, a homemaker, and Rick Ashmore, a manufacturing engineer. They were raised in Brampton, Ontario, where he attended Turner Fenton Secondary School and Earnscliffe Senior Public School. They have a "GMA" tattoo on their wrists that stands for "Good Man Ashmore"; their grandfather had a similar tattoo. On June 20, 2014, Aaron married Zoë Kate. In 2016, the couple's first child was born, a daughter. Their second daughter was born in 2019.

Ashmore is a fan of Star Trek: The Next Generation, Star Trek: Deep Space Nine and The X-Files.

Filmography

Film

Television

References

External links

 

1979 births
Canadian male child actors
Canadian male film actors
Canadian male television actors
Identical twin male actors
Living people
People from Richmond, British Columbia
Canadian twins
20th-century Canadian male actors
21st-century Canadian male actors